UHH or Uhh can refer to:

 University of Hawaii at Hilo
 University of Hamburg, comprehensive university in Hamburg, Germany
 Uhh, the symbol for the chemical element Unhexhexium